Henrik Sylvén, Henrik Wilhelm Sylvén, born in Lidingö, Sweden 11 June 1971 is a film director and scriptwriter for films, television shows and commercials. His first feature "Lovelife of a fat thief" premiered in 2006.

Filmography
"Understatements" (writer, director) (short) (Swe 2003)
"Lovelife of a fat thief" (Swedish title: Tjocktjuven) (writer, director) (2006) "Myggan" (staffwriter, director) (Television, Swe 2007-2008)"The Pact"' (writer, director) (rumoured, Swe/Can 2010)'

References

External links

1971 births
Living people
People from Lidingö Municipality
Swedish film directors